Norepinephrine, also known as noradrenaline, is a medication used to treat people with very low blood pressure. It is the typical medication used in sepsis if low blood pressure does not improve following intravenous fluids. It is the same molecule as the hormone and neurotransmitter norepinephrine. It is given by slow injection into a vein.

Common side effects include headache, slow heart rate, and anxiety. Other side effects include an irregular heartbeat. If it leaks out of the vein at the site it is being given, norepinephrine can result in limb ischemia. If leakage occurs the use of phentolamine in the area affected may improve outcomes. Norepinephrine works by binding and activating alpha adrenergic receptors.

Norepinephrine was discovered in 1946 and was approved for medical use in the United States in 1950. It is available as a generic medication.

Medical uses
Norepinephrine is used mainly as a sympathomimetic drug to treat people in vasodilatory shock states such as septic shock and neurogenic shock, while showing fewer adverse side-effects compared to dopamine treatment.

Mechanism of action
It stimulates α1 and α2 adrenergic receptors to cause blood vessel contraction, thus increases peripheral vascular resistance and resulted in increased blood pressure. This effect also reduces the blood supply to gastrointestinal tract and kidneys. Norepinephrine acts on beta-1 adrenergic receptors, causing increase in heart rate and cardiac output.  However, the elevation in heart rate is only transient, as baroreceptor response to the rise in blood pressure as well as enhanced vagal tone ultimately result in a sustained decrease in heart rate. Norepinephrine acts more on alpha receptors than the beta receptors.

Names
Norepinephrine is the INN while noradrenaline is the BAN.

References

External links 
 
 

Cardiac stimulants
Inotropic agents
Norepinephrine
Intensive care medicine
Wikipedia medicine articles ready to translate